Shah Said Bullo is a town located at the distance of 17 kilometers from Chakwal city in Punjab, Pakistan.

The village was named after Bawa Shah Said Bullo whose tomb is a famous site in this area. The people of Shah Said Bullo belong to Shiite sect of Islam. Imam Bargah Qadeemi, a historical religious organization is situated in the village. Imam Bargah Qasr-e-Shabbir is also situated near Qadeemi Imam Bargah.

Imam Bargah Qadeemi is under the control of an organization called Anjuman Ghulaman-e-Imam Moosa Kazim which organizes the Majalis on important Shiite holidays.

Imam Bargah Qasr-e-Shabbir also organizes Majalis on special Shiite occasions.

References

Populated places in Chakwal District